VP-AM-5 was a Amphibian Patrol Squadron of the U.S. Navy. The squadron was established as Amphibious Patrol Squadron 5 (VP-AM-5) on 21 November 1946 and disestablished on 31 December 1947.

Operational history
21 November 1946: VP-AM-5 was established at NAS Whidbey Island, Washington, as a medium amphibious seaplane squadron equipped with the PBY-5A Catalina. During its brief existence, the squadron came under the operational control of FAW-4 with a mission of weather reconnaissance and surveillance.
31 December 1947: Due to the absence of any perceived threat from the northern Pacific and congressional mandates to reduce force levels, the squadron was soon placed on the list of those scheduled for disestablishment. New, longer-range aircraft then coming into service, such as the P2V Neptune, negated the need for slower, more vulnerable seaplanes and so VP-AM-5 was disestablished at NAS Whidbey Island.

Aircraft assignments
The squadron was assigned the following aircraft, effective on the dates shown:
 PBY-5A - November 1946

Home port assignments
The squadron was assigned to these home ports, effective on the dates shown:
 NAS Whidbey Island, Washington - 21 November 1946

See also

 Maritime patrol aircraft
 List of inactive United States Navy aircraft squadrons
 List of United States Navy aircraft squadrons
 List of squadrons in the Dictionary of American Naval Aviation Squadrons
 History of the United States Navy

References

Patrol squadrons of the United States Navy
Wikipedia articles incorporating text from the Dictionary of American Naval Aviation Squadrons